Monophthongization is a sound change by which a diphthong becomes a monophthong, a type of vowel shift. It is also known as ungliding, as diphthongs are also known as gliding vowels. In languages that have undergone monophthongization, digraphs that formerly represented diphthongs now represent monophthongs. The opposite of monophthongization is vowel breaking.

Arabic

Some notable exceptions to this monophthongization are some rural Lebanese dialects, which preserve the original pronunciations of some of the diphthongs. Some varieties might maintain the diphthong for words recently borrowed from Standard Arabic or use them in free variation.

English
Some English sounds that may be perceived by native speakers as single vowels are in fact diphthongs; an example is the vowel sound in pay, pronounced . However, in some dialects (e.g. Scottish English)  is a monophthong .

Some dialects of English make monophthongs from former diphthongs. For instance, Southern American English tends to realize the diphthong  as in eye as a long monophthong , a feature known as /aj/ ungliding or /ay/ ungliding. Monophthongization is also one of the most widely used and distinguishing features of African American Vernacular English.

Smoothing
Smoothing is a monophthongization of a closing diphthong (most commonly ) before a vowel that can occur in Received Pronunciation and other accents of English. (Some have called this "levelling", but this is rarely used because it may be confused with dialect levelling.) For example, chaos, pronounced  without smoothing, becomes  with smoothing.

Smoothing can occur across word boundaries in the same conditions (closing diphthong + vowel), as in  way out,  they eat,  go off.

Old English

Hindi
The vowel sequences  and  exist in Hindi, but are written as āi and āu, with long initial vowels.

German
The so-called early frühneuhochdeutsche Monophthongierung (monophthongization in the earliest stages of New High German) is particularly important in today's Standard German. It changed the diphthongs ie , uo  and üe  to respectively ie , u  and ü :

Before 11th century > nowadays:
 liebe  > liebe 
   > gute 
 brüeder  > Brüder 
The digraph "ie" has kept its spelling despite monophthongization.

The New High German monophthongization started in the 11th century in the center of the German-speaking area. Bavarian and Alemannic dialects in the south did not undergo the monophthongization changes and thus these dialects remain in an older language state.

Greek
Greek underwent monophthongization at many points during its history. For more information, see  and Koine Greek phonology.

French
Similarly, the digraph  and trigraph  represent the monophthong  due to the same process.

Korean
Korean underwent monophthongization two times─18th century, and 20th century. Their common point is that all of the monophthongized vowels were falling diphthongs.

See also
 Idea-smoothing
 Fusion (phonetics)
 Synaeresis
 Vowel breaking
 Monophthongization of diphthongs in Proto-Slavic

References

Vowel shifts